The 1977 Hardie-Ferodo 1000 was a motor race for Group C Touring Cars, held on 2 October 1977 at the Mount Panorama Circuit just outside Bathurst in New South Wales, Australia. It was the 18th in a sequence of "Bathurst 1000" events commencing with the 1960 Armstrong 500.

The race was won by Allan Moffat for a record-equalling fourth time, driving with multiple Formula One Grand Prix and 24 Hours of Le Mans winner, Belgian legend Jacky Ickx. They finished in side-by-side formation with the Moffat Ford Dealers team's second Ford XC Falcon GS500 Hardtop driven by Colin Bond and Alan Hamilton in the most dominant team performance seen at the race (Hamilton got the drive after Bond's original nominated co-driver Gregg Hansford was unavailable due to injury from a motorcycle racing accident). Third was the first of the new A9X Hatchback Holden Toranas, a privateer entry driven by Peter Janson and Australian Formula One driver Larry Perkins.

Years after the event, Colin Bond stated that he wished he had powered past Moffat's ailing Falcon (Moffat's Falcon was out of brakes due to Ickx being too hard on them during his stint at the wheel) and won the race instead of playing to team orders (which came from team boss Moffat) to stay behind and let the #1 Ford win the race. Moffat also stated that during the race he had offered Bond a drive in his car, which would have seen Bond join Moffat and Ickx as winners, but the 1969 winner had declined preferring to continue in car #2. Moffat has also stated that as team owner he had no regrets about ordering Bond to remain behind as they were over a lap in front of the Torana driven by Janson / Perkins Torana and the pole winning Torana of Peter and Phil Brock, but had the Torana's been on the same lap and closing in, Bond would have been free to leave him behind and win the race for the Moffat Ford Dealers team.

Two-time Indianapolis 500 champion Johnny Rutherford made his only start in this race alongside his teammate Janet Guthrie, a fellow USAC Marlboro Championship Trail driver and the first woman to ever qualify for the Indianapolis 500 only months before. The pair drove the second of the Ron Hodgson Motors entered Toranas alongside defending race winners Bob Morris and John Fitzpatrick. Morris and Fitzpatrick drove one of the Torana A9X 4-Door sedans while Rutherford and Guthrie drove an A9X Hatchback. "Lone Star JR" qualified the Torana in 26th position, but during practice complained that his car wasn't as good as the Morris / Fitzpatrick car. To prove that it wasn't the car and it was just Rutherford's unfamiliarity with both the track and a right hand drive saloon, Morris ran a number of laps in practice in the car which were over 5 seconds faster than the Indy 500 winner had achieved. Although this actually qualified Morris in the car as he had been cross-entered, under the regulations Rutherford's fastest time of 2:34.8 was its official qualifying time as no driver could qualify another car for grid position other than their own nominated entry. The car carried the #17. As of the 2020 race this was the last time that number would be used by anyone other than Dick Johnson or his team Dick Johnson Racing (Johnson's Falcon carried the #13 in the race).

With the exception of 1988 and 2022, 1977 was the last time that the full grid at Bathurst was decided in the traditional qualifying sessions. 1978 would see the introduction of the "Hardies Heroes" top 10 runoff for pole where the fastest eight qualifiers, plus two at the stewards invitation, would have a chance at pole position with a runoff held the day before the race. The runoff was devised by race broadcaster Channel 7 and the race promoters, the Australian Racing Drivers' Club (ARDC) for extra television time.

1977 was also the last year in which four time race winner Harry Firth would be at Bathurst as either a driver or team manager. After having led the Holden Dealer Team since its formation in 1969, Firth, the 1961, 1962, 1963 and 1967 race winner, had announced his retirement. Firth, who won the last race held at Phillip Island in 1962 and the first held at Bathurst in 1963, as well as driving the first V8 powered car to victory in 1967, would go on to be CAMS Chief Scrutineer from 1978 to 1981 before retiring from the sport completely. During his time as HDT Team Manager, the Dealer Team had won Bathurst in 1969 with Colin Bond and Tony Roberts driving a Holden HT Monaro GTS350, and again in 1972 when Peter Brock took his first win driving a Holden LJ Torana GTR XU-1.

Class structure
Cars competed in three engine displacement classes:

3001cc – 6000cc
The class was contested by Holden Torana and Ford Falcon entries.

2001cc – 3000cc
The class was contested by Mazda RX3, Ford Capri and BMW 3.0Si entries.

Up to 2000cc
The class was contested by Alfa Romeo Alfetta and 2000 GTV, BMW 2002, Ford Escort RS2000, Holden Gemini, Toyota Celica, Triumph Dolomite and Volkswagen Golf entries.

Top 10 Qualifiers
1977 would be the final year (with the exception of 1988 and 2022) that official qualifying would count for the entire grid. From 1978, race broadcaster Channel 7 and the Australian Racing Drivers Club (ARDC) would introduce the Hardies Heroes top 10 runoff for the fastest 8 qualifiers and two invitees to have the chance to go for pole position on the Saturday. Hardies Heroes would also provide extra coverage time for Channel 7.

Results

Statistics
 Pole position - #25 Peter Brock - 2:24.1
 Fastest lap - #1 Allan Moffat - 2:26.4 (lap record)
 Race time of winning car - 6:59:07.8
 Average speed of winning car-

References

External links
 Race results at touringcarracing.net
 Race results at www.uniquecarsandparts.com.au
 Images at www.autopics.com.au

Motorsport in Bathurst, New South Wales
Hardie-Ferodo 1000